Arthur Victor Webster is a former Canadian politician, who represented the electoral district of Klondike in the Yukon Legislative Assembly from 1985 to 1992. He was a member of the Yukon New Democratic Party.

He was defeated by David Millar of the Yukon Party in the 1992 election. He subsequently served as mayor of Dawson City from 1994 to 1996.

References

1946 births
Living people
Mayors of Dawson City
Politicians from Toronto
Yukon New Democratic Party MLAs